Justin Salmon (born 25 January 1999) is a professional footballer who plays as a midfielder for Allsvenskan club Degerfors IF. Born in Sweden, he represents the Liberia national team.

International career
Salmon was born in Sweden to a Liberian father and Swedish mother. He was called up to represent the Liberia national team in August 2021.

References

1999 births
Living people
People with acquired Liberian citizenship
Liberian footballers
Association football midfielders
Liberia international footballers
Liberian people of Swedish descent
Swedish footballers
Eskilstuna City FK players
Karlslunds IF players
Västerås SK Fotboll players
Degerfors IF players
Ettan Fotboll players
Superettan players
Allsvenskan players
Swedish people of Liberian descent
Sportspeople of Liberian descent
Footballers from Stockholm